The CIRH Roller Hockey World Club Championship is a discontinued worldwide competition for the best roller hockey teams in the world. This competition was held for the first time in 2006, at Luanda, Angola and for the second and last time in 2008, at Reus, Spain. The competition was sanctioned by the International Rink Hockey Committee.

History

External links 
 CIRH website
 2008 World Club Championship Official Site
 HoqueiPatins.cat - World Roller Hockey

References 

 
Recurring sporting events established in 2006
Rink, Club
Club
Recurring sporting events disestablished in 2008